The Western line of the Mumbai Suburban Railway is a public transit system serving Mumbai Metropolitan Region, Maharashtra. It consists of 37 stations from Dahanu Road to Churchgate railway station. It is operated by Western Railways (WR). The entire line is at grade.

Trains are differentiated as slow and fast locals. Slow trains stop at all stations, while fast ones stop at important stations only and are preferable over longer distances. Trains usually start from and terminate at important stations. The section from Churchgate to Virar is a Quadruple track. An EMU car shed has been built between Nala Sopara and Virar which is the largest car shed in Asia. A repair shop for EMUs is situated at Mahalaxmi. There are also EMU car sheds at Mumbai Central and Kandivali.

History

Suburban service on what is now the Western line was offered by the Bombay, Baroda and Central India Railway, which began running steam trains in 1867. Rakes operating on DC electricity were introduced on 5 January 1928. Leslie Wilson (politician), the then-Governor of Bombay inaugurated the line running between Colaba and Borivali at Mahalaxmi, in the presence of 700 invitees.

The proposal to ply Electric Multiple Unit (EMU) trains between Dahanu and Churchgate was approved in the 2012–13 Railway Budget. In March 2013, 18 MEMU services ran between Virar and Dahanu daily.

On 16 April 2013, the 160th anniversary of the Indian Railways, Railway Minister Pawan Kumar Bansal inaugurated the first EMU service between Churchgate and Dahanu Road. The first Churchgate-Dahanu local was flagged off around 10:47am and arrived at Churchgate at 1:44pm. Prior to the launch of this service, EMU services on WR only ran on the 60 km stretch between Churchgate and Virar.

The Western Line transported 127.94 crore passengers (1.28 billion) in the 2016-17 fiscal year. This is higher than the population of India according to the 2011 Census, which was recorded as 121.01 crores.

Timeline
 12 April 1887: The BB commences daily service between Virar and Backbay
 1870: Churchgate station opened
 1873: Colaba Terminus commissioned
 5 January 1928: First electric train runs between Colaba & Borivili
 1930: Colaba station closed
 1936: Steam engines are withdrawn from service; Borivili–Virar section electrified
 2 March 1961: Introduction of 9-car trains
 1972: Total number of services crosses the 500 mark
 1986: Introduction of 12-car trains
 1992: Introduction of special trains for ladies and reserved seating for seniors
 1993: Introduction of special handicapped compartment
 2003: Total number of services crosses the 1,000 mark
 2007: Indian Railways' first ATVMs introduced on WR; DC-AC conversion of Borivili–Virar section completed
 21 November 2009 : Introduction of 15-car rakes
 November 2011: DC-AC conversion of Borivili–Vile Parle section complete
 5 February 2012 : Conversion from DC to AC traction completed
 16 April 2013 : Extension of line from Virar to Dahanu Road
 27 November 2016 : 37th station, Ram Mandir railway station at Oshiwara was opened between Goregaon and Jogeshwari station.
 25 December 2017 : The first air-conditioned suburban train service in India began at 10:32 AM departing from Borivali to Churchgate.

Stations

(Names in bold indicate that the station is a fast train stop.)

‡ indicates the stations which Fast Up trains (to Churchgate) skip from around 5PM to 8PM.

†A footbridge links Prabhadevi to Parel on the Central line.

Churchgate railway station is the terminus station at the south end of Mumbai city. In Mumbai, Western Line (WR) suburban trains use this station as terminus. Long distance trains and goods trains terminate at Mumbai Central railway station instead.

Above list of stations is mentioned from south end going towards northern suburban areas falling on WR corridor.

Electrification

Western Railway's EMU fleet consists of EMUs running on AC 25 kV power.  WR uses seven 9-car rakes.

The Western line began running electric trains with DC power on 5 January 1928.

On 5 February 2012, WR finished converting the entire Western line from the earlier used 1,500 V DC to 25 kV AC power. The entire power conversion project cost about 500 crore. Since 25 kV AC power is 17 times stronger than DC, people riding on top of the trains will be killed if they come into contact with the overhead wires.

The project was also expected to improve the punctuality of train services, make them energy-efficient and allow a greater number of 12-coach and 15-coach trains to ply. Post-conversion, local trains will be able to achieve speeds of 100 km/h with ease. The next step would be to convert the remaining 9-coach trains to 12-coach ones, thus augmenting the carrying capacity by 33%. The system will need less maintenance.

While using DC traction, 22 substations provided power to suburban trains on the Western line. Since switching over to AC traction, substations at Mahalaxmi, Bandra, Jogeshwari, Borivli and Vasai supply 25 kV power to local trains.

Services
As of 27 March 2012, the Western line has approximately 1,290 local services running which carry about 3.55 million commuters every day. These 1290 local services are operated using 80 trains. Western Railways' EMUs are in 12 car and 15 car formations.

The first 9-car service on the Western line ran on 2 March 1961. The 9-car service has since been phased out and the last service ran on the Western line on 20 November 2012. However, 10 services (six on CR and four on WR) were still operated as 9-car even after that date as the track is shared by the Western line and the Harbour line. Harbour line platforms are too short to accommodate longer trains.

In 2010, 15 car services between Churchgate and Virar were introduced. They halt at all the stations between Borivli and Virar, and do not halt at any stations between Churchgate and Dadar. 15-coach trains are used in non-peak hours. They cannot be used in peak hours because the station platforms are too narrow to handle the increased foot traffic.

Historical
The following table shows the number of services and daily ridership on the Western line throughout its history.

Facilities

Escalators
WR has escalators at 26 stations including some main stations like Borivali, Andheri, Dadar, Vasai Road and Virar for the common people. This helps the physically challenged and senior citizens.

FOBs and Subways
As of 29 April 2013, there are 102 foot over bridges (FOB) and 8 subways on the Western line.

Train Management System
The Train Management System (TMS) is used by both staff and passengers to monitor the location of trains. TMS enables commuters to know what trains will be arriving in the next 10 minutes. The system was implemented on the Western line in 2004.

Wi-Fi Facility 
Free Wi-Fi facility from the Indian Railways (RailWire) is provided at some stations of the Western Line like Churchgate, Mumbai Central, Dadar, Bandra, Khar Road, Andheri, Borivali, Bhayander, Vasai Road and Virar.

Fatalities
In 2011, 1,313 commuters died in accidents on the Western line, mainly via trespassing on ten particular stretches of track. Since mid-February 2012, Railway Protection Force (RPF) personnel patrol the areas from 7am-11am and 5pm-10pm, the peak times for such incidents. Initially, they used posters in an education campaign and only cautioned offenders. They later escalated to arresting people.

See also
 Western Railway Elevated Corridor
 Mumbai Suburban Railway
 List of Mumbai Suburban Railway stations
 Western Railways

References

Mumbai Suburban Railway lines
Railway lines opened in 1984
Rail transport in Mumbai
Transport in Vasai-Virar
Transport in Mira-Bhayandar
Transport in Mumbai
Transport in Palghar